Keswick is a census-designated place (CDP) in Shasta County, California. Its population is 188 as of the 2020 census, down from 451 from the 2010 census.

Geography
According to the United States Census Bureau, the CDP covers an area of 3.5 square miles (9.1 km2), 96.41% of it land and 3.59% of it water.

Demographics

The 2010 United States Census reported that Keswick had a population of 451. The racial makeup of Keswick was 389 (86.3%) White, 0 (0.0%) African American, 23 (5.1%) Native American, 6 (1.3%) Asian, 0 (0.0%) Pacific Islander, 4 (0.9%) from other races, and 29 (6.4%) from two or more races. Hispanic or Latino of any race were 14 persons (3.1%).

The Census reported that 451 people (100% of the population) lived in households, 0 (0%) lived in non-institutionalized group quarters, and 0 (0%) were institutionalized.

There were 179 households, out of which 56 (31.3%) had children under the age of 18 living in them, 84 (46.9%) were opposite-sex married couples living together, 23 (12.8%) had a female householder with no husband present, 17 (9.5%) had a male householder with no wife present.  There were 20 (11.2%) unmarried opposite-sex partnerships, and 0 (0%) same-sex married couples or partnerships. 42 households (23.5%) were made up of individuals, and 19 (10.6%) had someone living alone who was 65 years of age or older. The average household size was 2.52.  There were 124 families (69.3% of all households); the average family size was 2.87.

The population was spread out, with 97 people (21.5%) under the age of 18, 25 people (5.5%) aged 18 to 24, 98 people (21.7%) aged 25 to 44, 148 people (32.8%) aged 45 to 64, and 83 people (18.4%) who were 65 years of age or older.  The median age was 46.1 years. For every 100 females, there were 105.0 males.  For every 100 females age 18 and over, there were 109.5 males.

The homeowner vacancy rate was 1.9%; the rental vacancy rate was 6.3%.  356 people (78.9% of the population) lived in owner-occupied housing units and 95 people (21.1%) lived in rental housing units.

Politics

History
The town was catastrophically damaged by the 2018 Carr Fire, which destroyed all but two homes.

References

Census-designated places in Shasta County, California
Census-designated places in California